Helicase-like transcription factor is an enzyme that in humans is encoded by the HLTF gene.

Function 

This gene encodes a member of the SWI/SNF family. Members of this family have helicase and ATPase activities and are thought to regulate transcription of certain genes by altering the chromatin structure around those genes. The encoded protein contains a RING finger DNA binding motif. Two transcript variants encoding the same protein have been found for this gene. However, use of an alternative translation start site produces an isoform that is truncated at the N-terminus compared to the full-length protein.

HLTF is a double-stranded DNA translocase, one of two human homologs of Saccharomyces cerevisiae RAD5 besides SHPRH (SNF2 histone linker PHD RING helicase), that is able to carry out fork regression, similarly to Rad5.

Interactions 

HLTF has been shown to interact with UBE2N, RAD18 and UBE2V2(see also STRING functional and physical associations network : under the option  'search by name'  enter  'protein name'  of interest, HLTF, klick on  'GO! ', choose  'organism ', klick on  'continue ->' ).

References

Further reading